HMG-box containing 3 is a protein that in humans is encoded by the HMGXB3 gene.

Function

This gene is one of the non-canonical high mobility group (HMG) genes. The encoded protein contains an HMG-box domain found in DNA binding proteins such as transcription factors and chromosomal proteins.

References

Further reading 

Human proteins